Jack Edgecombe Rogers (30 March 1913 – 26 December 1997) was an Australian rules footballer who played with St Kilda in the Victorian Football League (VFL).

Rogers served in the Royal Australian Air Force for the duration of World War II.

Notes

External links 

1913 births
1997 deaths
Australian rules footballers from Victoria (Australia)
St Kilda Football Club players
People from Maryborough, Victoria
Royal Australian Air Force personnel of World War II
Military personnel from Victoria (Australia)